Azamora corusca is a species of snout moth in the genus Azamora. It was described by Julius Lederer in 1863, and is known from Venezuela and Brazil.

References

Chrysauginae
Moths described in 1863
Moths of South America